Gabriela Truşcă (later Robu, born 15 August 1957) is a retired Romanian artistic gymnast who won a team silver medal at the 1976 Olympics. After retiring from competitions, she became a coach at CSS Buzău, where she raised several generations of young gymnasts, including Gabriela Drăgoi.

References

External links

Small bio and List of competitive results

1957 births
Living people
Sportspeople from Bacău
Romanian female artistic gymnasts
Gymnasts at the 1976 Summer Olympics
Olympic gymnasts of Romania
Olympic silver medalists for Romania
Olympic medalists in gymnastics
Medalists at the 1976 Summer Olympics
20th-century Romanian women